Misophriidae is a family of copepods belonging to the order Misophrioida.

Genera:
 Arcticomisophria Martínez Arbizu & Seifried, 1996
 Benthomisophria Sars, 1909
 Dimisophria Boxshall & Iliffe, 1987
 Fosshageniella Jaume & Boxshall, 1997
 Misophria Boeck, 1865
 Misophriella Boxshall, 1983
 Misophriopsis Boxshall, 1983
 Stygomisophria Ohtsuka, Huys, Boxshall & Ito, 1992

References

Copepods